Ethany Mahoto (born 20 January 1999) is a Botswanan footballer who most recently played for Swedish Division 2 club Gottne IF and the Botswana national team.

Club career
Mahoto began playing football while still a child in Botswana. Throughout his career in Sweden, he has played mostly in the lower divisions after beginning in the academy of IFK Luleå. 

In 2019 he was offered a scholarship to play college soccer in the United States for the Vikings of North Park University.

Mahoto joined Gottne IF in January 2022 after appearing for Piteå IF and Notvikens IK the previous season. Later that year he revealed in an interview that he had opportunities to play at a higher level and became homesick every time, but was now ready to move forward. In November 2022 Mahoto left Gottne IF to seek out other opportunities.

International career
Mahoto was born in Francistown, Botswana to Namibian parents from the Zambezi Region before immigrating to Sweden with his mother. He was called up to the Namibian national team in February 2020 in preparation for the 2020 African Nations Championship. At the time he stated that Namibia is his homeland and he had no connection to Botswana other than being born there. The player decided to leave the training camp with no desire to return after seeing a lack of structure or plan forward for the team. He also noted that the two managers of the team at the time were at odds with each other and behaved unprofessionally.

Despite his previous comments, Mahoto accepted a call-up from Botswana national team coach Mogomotsi Mpote in November 2022 for a friendly against Angola. At the time, Mahoto stated that both Namibia and Botswana were his countries and he "loves both countries the same." However, he did not close the door on representing Namibia in the future, stating, "I will play for the team that wants me the most...and I will give everything to the country that gives me the chance."

Mahoto went on to receive his first senior cap for Botswana in the match against Angola, coming on as a late second-half substitute in the 0–1 defeat on 17 November 2022.

International statistics

References

External links
SvFF profile
Global Sports Archive profile

1999 births
Living people
People from Francistown
Namibian men's footballers
Swedish men's footballers
Botswana men's footballers
Botswana expatriate footballers
Botswana international footballers
Expatriate footballers in Sweden
Association football midfielders
Lindsdals IF players